Beautiful Stories from Shakespeare is a 1907 collection published by E. Nesbit with the intention of entertaining young readers and retelling William Shakespeare's plays in a way they could be easily understood by younger readers. She also included a brief Shakespeare biography, a pronunciation guide to some of the more difficult names and a list of famous quotations, arranged by subject. Some editions are entitled Beautiful Stories from Shakespeare for Children.

The book is an expanded version of Nesbit's earlier book, The Children's Shakespeare (1897), a collection of twelve tales likewise based on plays by William Shakespeare.

Contents
The collection includes:
A Midsummer Night's Dream
The Tempest
As You Like It
The Winter's Tale
King Lear
Twelfth Night
Much Ado About Nothing
Romeo and Juliet
Pericles
Hamlet
Cymbeline
Macbeth
The Comedy of Errors
The Merchant of Venice
Timon of Athens
Othello
The Taming of the Shrew
Measure for Measure
Two Gentlemen of Verona
All's Well That Ends Well

Reception and analysis 
Published in 1907, the book has received a number of editions over the later years. Nesbit's collection presents a reworked version of the tales, rewritten to suit what Nesbit considered to be child's mentality and interpretative skills. The tales are sometimes prefaced with the opening "Once upon a time". Iona Opie in her introduction to the 1997 edition praised Nesbit's work by saying that she "has rehabilitated the plays as pure entertainment. She tells the stories with clarity and gusto.... giving the flavour of each play by the skillful use of short quotations"

Erica Hateley described Nesbit's style as follows: "she often retains scraps of the Shakespearean language, but glosses a meaning (or even an interpretation) for it, and quickly summarises entire scenes in brief paragraphs".

References

External links
 
 

1907 short story collections
Children's short story collections
British children's books
Adaptations of works by William Shakespeare
20th-century British children's literature
Works by E. Nesbit
1907 children's books